Dactylanthias is a small genus of fish belonging to the Anthiinae subfamily. It includes only two species from Ambon Island, Indonesia and the Tuamotus, French Polynesia.

Taxonomy
Dactylanthias was first established by the Dutch ichthyologist Pieter Bleeker in 1871. It is classified under the subfamily Anthiadinae of the family Serranidae.

Description
Dactylanthias was known only from a single specimen of Dactylanthias aplodactylus from Ambon Island, Indonesia, until another species was described in 2007 from the Tuamotus of French Polynesia.

Species
The following species are classified under Dactylanthias:
 Dactylanthias aplodactylus (Bleeker, 1858)
 Dactylanthias baccheti Randall, 2007

References

Anthiinae
Marine fish genera